The blue-necked jacamar or blue-cheeked jacamar (Galbula cyanicollis) is a species of bird in the family Galbulidae. It is found in  Brazil, Bolivia, and Peru.

Taxonomy and systematics

The blue-necked jacamar is monotypic. It and the yellow-billed jacamar (Galbula albirostris) were at one time considered conspecific but have been treated as a superspecies since approximately 1974.

Description

The male's upper parts are shiny green and the underparts chestnut. The face is steely blue to green on an east to west gradient. The female is duller and its underparts are tawny buff.

Distribution and habitat

The blue-necked jacamar occurs east of the Andes and south of the Amazon River. It is found in eastern Peru, far northern Bolivia, and in Brazil east to Maranhão and south to Rondônia and northern Mato Grosso. It inhabits the interior of terra firme and várzea forests. There it is found in the lower strata and often in small gaps. It also occurs in gallery forest in the cerrado of Brazil.

Behavior

Feeding

The blue-necked jacamar's diet is a large variety of insects. It perches on exposed branches and sallies from there to catch its flying prey.

Breeding

Two blue-necked jacamar nest burrows were found in arboreal termite nests in Brazil, one in June and the other in October; each held two eggs. Birds in breeding condition were found in September.

Vocalization

The voice of the blue-necked jacamar is essentially the same as that of the yellow-billed. A song is here  and a call here.

Status

The IUCN has assessed the blue-necked jacamar as being of Least Concern. It occurs in several protected areas and is generally common over its range. However, "Owing to its greater reliance on intact forest understorey, this species, as G. albirostris, is likely to be more susceptible to deforestation than are most other jacamars."

References

blue-necked jacamar
Birds of the Amazon Basin
blue-necked jacamar
Taxonomy articles created by Polbot